Borkowo railway station is a railway station serving the town of Borkowo, in the Pomeranian Voivodeship, Poland. The station opened in 1938 and is located on the Nowa Wieś Wielka–Gdynia Port railway. The train services are operated by SKM Tricity.

Modernisation
In 2014 the station was modernised. In 2015 the railway south of the station was renovated as part of the works for the Pomorska Kolej Metropolitalna, introducing a crossover with the Pruszcz Gdanski–Leba railway to allow trains to operate to Kartuzy.

Train services
The station is served by the following services:

Pomorska Kolej Metropolitalna services (R) Kartuzy — Gdańsk Port Lotniczy (Airport) — Gdańsk Główny 
Pomorska Kolej Metropolitalna services (R) Kościerzyna — Gdańsk Port Lotniczy (Airport) — Gdańsk Wrzeszcz — Gdynia Główna
Pomorska Kolej Metropolitalna services (R) Kościerzyna — Gdańsk Osowa — Gdynia Główna

References

 This article is based upon a translation of the Polish language version as of July 2016.

Railway stations in Pomeranian Voivodeship
Kartuzy County
Railway stations in Poland opened in 1938